Wang Xi may refer to:

Wang Xi (emperor) (died 944), emperor of the Chinese Five Dynasties and Ten Kingdoms Period state Min
Wang Xi (Go player) (born 1984), Chinese Go player
Elvis Wang (born 1985), or Wang Xi, Chinese pop bass singer
Wong He (born 1967), or Wang Xi, Hong Kong actor, singer, and presenter
Wang Xi (politician) (born 1966), Chinese politician